Lieutenant General Count Wilhelm Archibald Douglas (19July 1883 – 5July 1960) was a Swedish Army officer and nobleman who served as Chief of the Army from 1944 to 1948.

Early life
Douglas was born on 19 July 1883 at Stjärnorp Castle, Östergötland County and was the second of four sons of Count Ludvig Douglas, Marshal of the Realm, and Countess Anna Louise Dorotea (née Ehrensvärd). His younger brother, Count Carl Douglas (1888–1946), was a chamberlain, and his elder brother Robert (1880–1955), a nobleman in Germany, married dowager Queen Augusta Victoria of Portugal, widow of King Manuel II. Archibald Douglas was cousin to general Carl August Ehrensvärd (his successor on the Chief of the Army post), vice admiral Gösta Ehrensvärd and Deputy Director of the Ministry of Defence Augustin Ehrensvärd.

Career
He was commissioned as an officer in 1903 and was promoted to lieutenant in the Life Regiment Dragoons (K 2) in 1906. Douglas was lieutenant in the General Staff in 1913 and served as general staff officer in the staff of the 1st Army Division (I. arméfördelningen) from 1914 to 1917. He was promoted to captain in 1916 and did the same year a study trip to Galicia region in Central-Eastern Europe. Back in Sweden, Douglas served as a military history teacher at the Royal Swedish Army Staff College in Stockholm from 1917 to 1918 and as general staff officer at the Finnish headquarters during the Finnish Civil War in 1918. During his time in Finland in 1918, he became captain and lieutenant colonel in the Finnish Army and took part in the Battle of Länkipohja and Battle of Tampere. Back in Sweden, Douglas became ryttmästare and squadron commander in the Life Regiment Dragoons in 1919 and taught ground warfare at the Royal Swedish Naval Staff College on and off between 1919 and 1929.

In 1922, Douglas returned to the General Staff as captain and became major there in 1924. He served as chief of staff of the 5th Army Division (V. arméfördelningen) from 1923 to 1927 when he became major in the Life Regiment Dragoons. Douglas became lieutenant colonel in the Life Regiment of Horse (K 1) in 1928. He was promoted to colonel and appointed commanding officer of Norrland Dragoon Regiment (K 4) in 1930 and in 1935 Douglas was appointed executive officer of the Life Regiment of Horse. In 1937 Douglas was promoted to major general and appointed commanding officer of Upper Norrland's Troops (Övre Norrlands trupper) and in 1940 he conducted a study trip to Germany and France. In 1942 he was appointed Inspector of the Swedish Army and the year after he was chairman of the Officer Training Investigation (Officersutbildningsutredningen). In 1944, Douglas was promoted to lieutenant general and was appointed Chief of the Army. During this time he also served as president of the Royal Swedish Academy of War Sciences from 1945 to 1947. Douglas retired from the military in 1948.

Beside his military career, Douglas was a member of the Stockholm City Council from 1921 to 1923 and served as aide-de-camp to King Gustaf V from 1920 to 1930 and as chief aide-de-camp (överadjutant) to King Gustaf V from 1931 to 1950.

Personal life
In 1907 he married Astri Henschen (1883–1976) in Ronneby. She was the daughter of Professor Salomon Eberhard Henschen and Gerda (née Sandell). Douglas lived in Villa Parkudden in Djurgården, and also owned Stjärnorp Castle in Östergötland County from 1947. The ancestral Stjärnorp Castle, which his father had purchased back to the family some years before Archibald's birth, was designated as Archibald's family seat.

He was the father of the Ambassador Carl Ludvig Douglas (1908–1961) and company executive Gösta Archibald Douglas (1910–1992) and grandfather of financier Gustaf Douglas. Through his eldest son, Carl Ludvig, he is the grandfather of Princess Elisabeth, Duchess in Bavaria, wife of Prince Max, Duke in Bavaria. He is also the grandfather of Rosita Spencer-Churchill, Duchess of Marlborough, the third wife of John Spencer-Churchill, 11th Duke of Marlborough, they divorced in 2008.

Douglas wrote biographical literature and biographies of Marshal of Finland Carl Gustaf Emil Mannerheim (his Finnish contemporary), and Swedish Field Marshal Robert Douglas, Count of Skenninge, his ancestor.

Death
Douglas died in a car accident in Grensholm near Linköping on 5 July 1960. Douglas, who was 76 at the time, was on his way home from a visit to Norrköping.

Dates of rank
1906 – Lieutenant
1916 – Captain
1919 – Ryttmästare
1924 – Major
1928 – Lieutenant colonel
1930 – Colonel
1937 – Major general
1944 – Lieutenant general

Awards and decorations

Swedish
   King Gustaf V's Jubilee Commemorative Medal (1948)
   King Gustaf V's Jubilee Commemorative Medal (1928)
   King Gustaf V's Commemorative Medal (16 February 1951)
   Commander Grand Cross of the Order of the Sword
   Knight of the Order of the Polar Star
   Knights of the Order of Vasa
   Home Guard Medal of Merit in Gold
   National Association of Volunteer Motor Transport Corps Medal of Merit in gold

Foreign
   Grand Cross of the Order of the Dannebrog
   Grand Cross of the Order of St. Olav
   Second Class of the Order of the Cross of Liberty with Swords
   Third Class of the Order of the Cross of Liberty with Swords
   Commander First Class of the Order of the White Rose of Finland
   Commander of the Order of the Star of Ethiopia
   Commander Second Class of the Order of the White Lion
   Officer of the Order of Orange-Nassau with Swords
   Third Class of the Order of Saint Stanislaus

Bibliography

References

Further reading
 "Gen. Archibald Douglas", The Times (9 July 1960): 10.

External links
Article by Douglas on Mannerheim

1883 births
1960 deaths
Swedish Army lieutenant generals
Chiefs of Army (Sweden)
People from Linköping Municipality
Swedish people of Scottish descent
Archibald Douglas-Stjernorp
Road incident deaths in Sweden
Members of the Royal Swedish Academy of War Sciences
Commanders Grand Cross of the Order of the Sword
Knights of the Order of the Polar Star
Knights of the Order of Vasa
Recipients of orders, decorations, and medals of Ethiopia